Żonqor Battery is an artillery battery in Marsaskala, Malta, standing on high ground overlooking Marsaskala Bay. It is a polygonal fort and was built by the British from 1882 to 1886.

History
Żonqor Battery was built by the British between 1882 and 1886 at a cost of £5000 (or £6000). It has a pentagonal shape, and it is surrounded by a 6 metre wide ditch. The firing positions and ammunition depots were located below ground level to protect them from enemy fire. Its gun crew and garrison were stationed at the nearby Fort Leonardo.

Soon after being completed, the battery was found out to be inadequate since the range of its RML 7 inch guns did not reach the area of the bay they were supposed to defend. Due to this, new plans were made to defend the bay by Governor Lintorn Simmons, but these were never implemented.

The battery is believed to have been armed with three canons, but it is said that they may have never been adjusted into place for use. The battery's guns were eventually dismantled, and in World War II, the battery was used as a warehouse for ammunition.

Present day
The battery is now used for agricultural purposes and it is not open to the public.

References

Polygonal forts in Malta
British fortifications in Malta
Batteries in Malta
Military installations established in 1886
Ammunition dumps
Limestone buildings in Malta
19th-century fortifications
Buildings and structures in Marsaskala